The Texaco Footballer of the Year was a Gaelic football award, created in 1958, that honoured the achievements of a footballer of outstanding excellence.  The award was part of the Texaco Sportstars Awards, in which Irish sportspeople from all fields were honoured.

The award was presented annually to the Gaelic footballer considered to have performed the best over the previous year in the Football Championship.  Voting for the award was undertaken by a select group of journalists from television and the print media.  The award itself, standing 14 inches high, was one of the most sought-after accolades in Irish sport.

This award is distinct from the All Stars Footballer of the Year, awarded by the GAA since 1995, as part of the GAA GPA All Stars Awards. Marc and Tomás Ó Sé of Kerry, and Alan and Bernard Brogan (junior) of Dublin are the only pairs of brothers to have won the award. Jack O'Shea of Kerry has won the award the most times, with four wins.

The award was discontinued in 2012 after Texaco withdrew their sponsorship.

Recipients

References

1958 establishments in Ireland
Awards established in 1958
Gaelic football awards
Texaco
Annual events in Ireland